Nikolayevka is a rural locality (a station) in Mikhaylovsky District, Altai Krai, Russia. The population was 5 as of 2013. There are 2 streets.

References 

Rural localities in Mikhaylovsky District, Altai Krai